Birla Institute of Technology International Centre (BITIC), Bahrain is the first international centre of Birla Institute of Technology, located in Budaiya, Bahrain.

It is a campus of the Birla Institute of Technology system based in India, focused on technical and management education. The campus was established in 2000.

Parent University

BITIC offers degree programs of Birla Institute of Technology, Mesra (BIT, Mesra), India. The course curriculum and the teaching, learning process are exactly similar to that of BIT, Mesra. BIT was established by philanthropist industrialist Mr. B.M. Birla in 1955 at Ranchi, the industrial centre of India. BIT is a full member of the Association of Commonwealth Universities. It was conferred Deemed University status in 1986 due to the achievements of the Institute, both in terms of research and excellent standards of academic programmes. The Institute has been accredited by the National Assessment & Accreditation Council (NAAC), and the National Board of Accreditation (NBA) established by the UGC & AICTE respectively.

BIT has consistently been ranked among top institutes in India in the field of Engineering by leading Indian publications like India Today, Outlook, Dataquest India, Mint etc.

Academic programs
BITIC, Bahrain offers following Academic Programs:

 Bachelor of Engineering (BE)
 Computer Science & Engineering
 Electrical & Electronics Engineering
 Electronics & Communication Engineering
 Mechanical Engineering
 Production Engineering
 Master in Business Administration (MBA)
 Executive MBA Programme for working professionals
 Bachelor of Business Administration (BBA)
 BSc in Information Technology
 B.Com. (E-Commerce)
 Diploma in Technology
 Computer Science & Engineering
 Production Engineering

Famous Alumni Students

Hitesh Megchiani - Entrepreneur & Public Speaker

BITIC, Bahrain closed down in 2012-2013.

See also
 Birla Institute of Technology, Mesra
 Birla Institute of Technology – Science and Technology Entrepreneurs' Park
 Waljat Colleges of Applied Sciences

References

Oxford book of deemed universities 2008

External links
 Birla Institute of Technology, Mesra

International Centre
Universities in Bahrain
Educational institutions established in 2000
2000 establishments in Bahrain